Ludmila or Ludmilla is a female given name of Slavic origin. It consists of two elements: lud ("people") and mila ("dear, love"). Because the initial L is mostly soft (palatalized), it is sometimes also transcribed Lyudmila, Lyudmyla or Ljudmila, and is written as Ľudmila or Ľudmyla in Slovak. 

Other variants include: Людмила, (Bulgarian, Russian and Ukrainian), Людміла (Belarusian), Људмила (Macedonian and Serbian), Ludomiła, Ludmiła, Ludzimiła, Ludźmiła (Polish), and Ludmilla (Hungarian).

Nicknames in Russian are: Люда (Lyuda), Люся (Lyusya), Мила (Mila)

The most notable bearer is Ludmila of Bohemia, a 10th-century princess and the grandmother of Wenceslaus I, Duke of Bohemia. The feast day for the saint is September 16, which is celebrated as a name day in Hungary, Poland, the Czech Republic, and Slovakia. Other name days include September 17 (Hungary), and February 20, May 7, July 30, and October 26 (Poland).

People with the given name Ludmila or variants include:

Medieval and early modern eras
In chronological order
 Ludmila of Bohemia (c. 860–921), Czech Orthodox and Roman Catholic saint and martyr
 Ludmila (wife of Mieszko I Tanglefoot) (died after 1210), High Duchess of Poland
 Ludmilla of Bohemia (died 1240), Duchess consort of Bavaria
 Ludmilla Elisabeth of Schwarzburg-Rudolstadt (1640–1672), Countess of Schwarzburg-Rudolstadt and hymn poet

Late modern era
In alphabetical order
 Lyudmila Andonova, Bulgarian high jumper
 Ludmilla Assing (1821–1880), German writer
 Ludmila Bášová, Czech badminton player 
 Ludmila Belousova, Russian figure skater
 Lyudmyla Blonska, Ukrainian heptathlete
 Lyudmila Butuzova, Soviet high jumper
 Lyudmila Byakova, Russian seamstress
 Lyudmila Chernykh, Soviet astronomer
 Ludmilla Chiriaeff (1924–1996), Soviet-born Canadian ballet dancer, choreographer, teacher and company director
 Lyudmyla Denisova, Ukrainian politician and former Minister of Labor and Social Policy
 Ludmila Engquist, Swedish hurdler
 Ludmila Ezhova, Russian gymnast
 Ludmila Ferber, Brazilian singer
 Ludmila Formanová, Czech middle distance runner
 Lyudmila Gurchenko, Russian film actress
 Ludmila Javorová, Czech vicar general
 Ludmila Oliveira da Silva, Brazilian singer
 Lyudmila Karachkina, Soviet astronomer
 Lyudmila Kolchanova, Russian long jumper
 Lyudmila Kondratyeva, Russian athlete
 Ludmilla Kunzmann (1774–1843), Czech industrialist
 Lyudmyla Lyatetska (1941–2020), Ukrainian paediatrician
 Ľudmyla Cervanová, Slovak tennis player
 Ľudmyla Melicherová, Slovak long-distance runner
 Ľudmyla Pajdušáková, Slovak astronomer
 Ludmilla Pajo, Albanian journalist and author
 Lyudmila Pavlichenko (1916–1974), Ukrainian Soviet sniper during World War II
 Lyudmila Petrova, Russian long-distance runner
 Ludmila Polesná (1934–1988), Czechoslovak world champion slalom canoeist
 Lyudmila Poradnyk, Soviet Ukrainian handball player
 Liudmila Privivkova, Russian curler
 Ludmila Prokunina-Olsson (born 1967), Russian medical geneticist
 Lyudmyla Pushkina, Ukrainian long-distance runner
 Lyudmila Putina, former wife of Vladimir Putin
 Lyudmila Rudenko (1904–1986), Soviet chess player and second women's world chess champion
 Liudmila Samsonova, Russian tennis player
 Ludmila da Silva, Brazilian footballer
 Ludmila Semenyaka, Russian ballerina
 Lyudmila Shevtsova, Russian athlete
 Lyudmila Stanukinas (1930–2020), Soviet documentary filmmaker
 Ludmilla Tchérina (1924–2004), French prima ballerina, sculptor, actress, painter, choreographer and novelist
 Ludmilla Tourischeva (born 1952), Russian Olympic and world champion gymnast
 Ludmila Vachtová (1933–2020), Czech art historian and critic
 Lyudmila Verbitskaya (1936–2019), Russian linguist and teacher; president of Saint Petersburg State University
 Lyudmila Veselkova, Soviet middle distance runner
 Lyudmila Zhivkova, Bulgarian politician
 Lyudmila Zhuravleva, Soviet astronomer
 Lyudmila Zykina, Russian singer

Fictional characters
 Ludmilla, the main antagonist of Bartok the Magnificent
 Ludmilla Vipiteno, the "Other Reader" in the novel If on a winter's night a traveler, by Italo Calvino

See also
  or Ljudmilla

Czech feminine given names
Slovak feminine given names
Slovene feminine given names
Polish feminine given names
Russian feminine given names
Serbian feminine given names
Croatian feminine given names
Ukrainian feminine given names